Kenneth Geoffrey Oudejans (born Amsterdam, Netherlands ), better known by his stage name Kenneth G, is a Dutch DJ and record producer.

He became known in 2013 with his releases on the Dutch label Hysteria Records before joining Revealed Recordings the following year.

Discography

Charting singles

Singles
 2008: Wobble [Club Generation]
 2009: Konichiwa Bitches! (with Nicky Romero) [Made In NL (Spinnin')]
 2010: Are U Serious [Selekted Music]
 2011: Tjoppings [Made In NL (Spinnin')]
 2012: Bazinga [Hysteria Recs]
 2012: Wobble [Big Boss Records]
 2013: Duckface (with Bassjackers) [Hysteria Recs]
 2013: Basskikker [Ones To Watch Records (Mixmash)]
 2013: Stay Weird [Hysteria Recs]
 2013: Rage-Aholics [Revealed Recordings]
 2014: RAVE-OLUTION (with AudioTwinz) [Hysteria Recs]
 2014: 97 (with FTampa) [Revealed Recordings]
 2014: Rampage (with Bassjackers) [Revealed Recordings]
 2014: Blowfish (with Quintino) [Fly Eye Records]
 2014: Zeus (with MOTi) [Musical Freedom]
 2015: Pop (with Reez) [Wall Recordings]
 2015: Kung Fu (with Maurice West) [Mainstage Music]
 2016: Bonzaï [Mainstage Music]
 2016: We Are One (featuring Ilang) [Armada Trice]
 2016: East West (with MOTi) [Heldeep]
 2017: Omen (with MOTi and Olly James) [Revealed Recordings]
 2019: Bring The House (with Sheezan) [Zero Cool]
 2019: Party Starter (with Sheezan) [Zero Cool]
 2020: Body Count (with Sheezan) [Zero Cool]

Remixes
 2012: Joachim Garraud, Alesia - Nox (MOTi & Kenneth G Remix) [Dim Mak Records]
 2013: D-Rashid, Rishi Bass, MC Stretch - Casera (Kenneth G Remix) [Big Boss Records]
 2014: Jason Herd, Sherry St Germain - This Is What We Came For (Kenneth G Remix) [Onelove]
 2019: Sheezan x Mike Bocki - Atticus (Kenneth G Edit)

IDS/Unreleased Tracks
 2017: Adele - Hello (W&W & Kenneth G Bootleg)

References

Notes
 A  Did not enter the Ultratop 50, but peaked on the Flemish Ultratip chart.

Sources

External links
 
 Beatport

1987 births
Dutch dance musicians
Dutch DJs
Dutch record producers
Living people
Musicians from Amsterdam
Remixers